A magnitude 4.5 earthquake struck the Pakistani province of Sindh on May 8 at a depth of . The earthquake killed two people and another 50 were wounded.

See also
 List of earthquakes in 2014
 List of earthquakes in Pakistan

References

2014 disasters in Pakistan
2014 earthquakes
History of Sindh (1947–present)
Earthquakes in Pakistan